Timashevka is a rural locality (a village) in Petrovsky Selsoviet, Ishimbaysky District, Bashkortostan, Russia. The population was 385 as of 2010. There are 5 streets.

Geography 
Timashevka is located 25 km northeast of Ishimbay (the district's administrative centre) by road. Solyony is the nearest rural locality.

References 

Rural localities in Ishimbaysky District